"It Feels So Good" is a song by British singer Sonique. It was originally released on 9 November 1998 and peaked at number 24 on the UK Singles Chart. In May 2000, in the wake of the song's success in the United States, the single was re-released and spent three weeks at number one on the same chart. The song remained in the top 40 for 14 weeks and became the third-biggest-selling single of 2000 in Britain. It has sold over 700,000 copies in the UK as of October 2014.

The song also proved successful in many other countries, including the United States, where repeated radio airplay in Florida helped it reach number eight on the Billboard Hot 100 and led Sonique to sign with Republic Records. In 2017, BuzzFeed listed the song at number 33 in their list of "The 101 Greatest Dance Songs of the '90s".

Background and content
Sonique said of the song, "It's about this guy whom I really liked years ago, but who didn't return my feelings. For he was very successful and I wasn't — at that time. And he thought that I was in love with his success. This song is just a way of declaring that it was him I liked." The song received widespread acclaim after it was played by a Tampa, Florida deejay in February 2000. Because of the song's popularity, Sonique was approached by Universal Music executives Doug Morris and Jimmy Iovine. She was eventually signed to Universal, and her album Hear My Cry was the first to be released on Universal's new internet-based record label, Republic Records.

Music video
One of two music videos for the song was directed by Tim Story and premiered in February 2000.

Track listings

Original release

UK CD1 (1998)
 "It Feels So Good" (original 7-inch mix)
 "It Feels So Good" (12-inch breakbeat edit)
 "It Feels So Good" (Serious remix)

UK CD2 (1998)
 "It Feels So Good" (7-inch breakbeat edit)
 "It Feels So Good" (original 12-inch mix)
 "I Put a Spell on You" (remastered 12-inch mix)

UK 12-inch single (1998)
A1. "It Feels So Good" (12-inch breakbeat edit)
B1. "It Feels So Good" (original 12-inch mix)
B2. "It Feels So Good" (Serious remix)

US CD single (1999)
 "It Feels So Good" (7-inch breakbeat) – 3:49
 "It Feels So Good" (12-inch breakbeat) – 6:02

Australian CD single (1999)
 "It Feels So Good" (original 7-inch mix)
 "It Feels So Good" (breakbeat 7-inch)
 "It Feels So Good" (Serious remix)
 "It Feels So Good" (original 12-inch mix)
 "It Feels So Good" (video)

Re-release (2000)

UK CD single
 "It Feels So Good" (radio edit) – 3:49
 "It Feels So Good" (Can 7 Soulfood club mix) – 7:57
 "It Feels So Good" (The Conductor & The Cowboy's Amnesia Mix) – 8:11

UK 12-inch single
A1. "It Feels So Good" (Can 7 Soulfood club mix) – 7:57
AA1. "It Feels So Good" (original breakbeat mix) – 6:02
AA2. "It Feels So Good" (En-Motion Remix) – 5:52

UK cassette single
 "It Feels So Good" (radio edit) – 3:49
 "It Feels So Good" (Can 7 Soulfood club mix) – 7:57
 "It Feels So Good" (Serious remix) – 7:50

European CD single
 "It Feels So Good" (radio edit) – 3:49
 "It Feels So Good" (Serious remix) – 7:50

Charts

Weekly charts

Year-end charts

Decade-end charts

Certifications

Release history

See also
 List of Romanian Top 100 number ones of the 2000s

References

External links
 
 

1998 singles
1998 songs
2000 singles
Breakbeat songs
Eurodance songs
Number-one singles in Hungary
Number-one singles in Norway
Number-one singles in Portugal
Number-one singles in Romania
Number-one singles in Scotland
Republic Records singles
RPM Top Singles number-one singles
Sonique (musician) songs
Trance songs
UK Singles Chart number-one singles
Universal Music Group singles
Music videos directed by Tim Story